Carlinghow railway station served the district of Carlinghow, in the historic county of West Riding of Yorkshire, England, from 1872 to 1917 on the Birstall Branch line.

History 
The station was opened on 1 April 1872 by the London and North Western Railway. It closed as a wartime economy measure on 15 April 1917. Like , it erroneously showed as 'service suspended' in Bradshaw.

References

External links 

Disused railway stations in West Yorkshire
Former London and North Western Railway stations
Railway stations in Great Britain opened in 1872
Railway stations in Great Britain closed in 1917
1872 establishments in England
1917 disestablishments in England